Acharlahalli  is a village in the southern state of Karnataka, India. It is located 3 km from Nandi Hills and 5 km from Muddenahalli-Kanivenarayanapura. It is located in the Dod Ballapur taluk of Bangalore Rural district.

See also
 Bangalore Rural
 Districts of Karnataka

References

External links
 https://bangalorerural.nic.in/en/

Villages in Bangalore Rural district